Miroslav Rikanović (born 20 January 1983) is a Serbian football forward who plays for FC Oberhofen in Austria.

Career
He played with many clubs in Serbia, and Bosnia and Herzegovina. He also played with Ukrainian club Zorya Luhansk, and he made 4 appearances in Albanian Superliga, playing for Elbasani.

External links
 
 

1983 births
Living people
Sportspeople from Zrenjanin
Association football forwards
Serbian footballers
FK Mladost Apatin players
FK ČSK Čelarevo players
FK Cement Beočin players
FK Jedinstvo Ub players
FK Sloga Kraljevo players
FK Proleter Novi Sad players
FK Radnički Sombor players
FK Borac Banja Luka players
FK Sloga Doboj players
FK Radnik Bijeljina players
FK Banat Zrenjanin players
Serbian expatriate footballers
Serbian expatriate sportspeople in Ukraine
Expatriate footballers in Ukraine
FC Zorya Luhansk players
Serbian expatriate sportspeople in Albania
Expatriate footballers in Albania
Serbian expatriate sportspeople in Bosnia and Herzegovina
Expatriate footballers in Bosnia and Herzegovina
Serbian expatriate sportspeople in Austria
Expatriate footballers in Austria
Kategoria Superiore players
KF Elbasani players